The IWF World Weightlifter of the Year award is a prize that can be won by weightlifters participating in events within the sport of weightlifting organised by the International Weightlifting Federation (IWF).

Men

Women

See also
International Weightlifting Federation
World Weightlifting Championships
List of world records in Olympic weightlifting

References

Weightlifting
Awards established in 1982
Most valuable player awards